John Venner Hodgson (30 September 1913 – 1970) was a footballer who played in the Football League for Doncaster Rovers and Grimsby Town.

References

1913 births
1970 deaths
Sportspeople from Seaham
Footballers from County Durham
English footballers
Association football defenders
Seaham Colliery Welfare F.C. players
Doncaster Rovers F.C. players
Grimsby Town F.C. players
English Football League players
English football managers
Doncaster Rovers F.C. managers